Sueviota aprica, the sunny dwarfgoby, is a species of fish in the family Gobiidae. found in Indonesia.This species reaches a length of .

References

aprica
Taxa named by Richard Winterbottom
Taxa named by Douglass F. Hoese
Fish described in 1988